Innocent Bystanders is a 1972 spy thriller directed by Peter Collinson that was filmed in Spain and Turkey. It stars Stanley Baker and Geraldine Chaplin. The screenplay was written by James Mitchell based on his novel The Innocent Bystanders (1969). Mitchell had previously written several John Craig spy thrillers under the name James Munro.

Plot
John Craig (Baker) is an aging British secret agent who is tasked with returning a defector, the Russian scientist Kaplan (Sheybal) who has foregone science for a modest life as a goatherd in Turkey. Craig faces opposition from his boss, his younger replacements, an American secret agent, a Turkish hotel keeper, and an organization of Russian Jews hostile to Kaplan. Craig's mission is complicated by Miriam (Chaplin), an innocent bystander who is taken hostage.

Cast
 Stanley Baker as John Craig
 Geraldine Chaplin as Miriam Loman
 Donald Pleasence as Loomis
 Dana Andrews as Blake
 Sue Lloyd as Joanna Benson
 Derren Nesbitt as Andrew Royce  
 Vladek Sheybal as Aaron Kaplan  
 Warren Mitchell as Omar  
 Cec Linder as Mankowitz  
 Howard Goorney as Zimmer  
 J. G. Devlin as Waiter  
 Ferdy Mayne as Marcus Kaplan (dubbed by Robert Rietty)
 Clifton Jones as Hetherton  
 John Collin as Asimov
 Aharon Ipalé as Gabrilovitch

Reception
Roger Greenspun was dissatisfied with what he termed the "general inconsequence" that the script evokes. However, Greenspun expressed that Chaplin's performance was "so reticent and so appealing as to constitute a small personal triumph. She is granted the film's only moments of quiet intelligence. She fills these moments with delicate intimacy that contrasts with everything else in the film that really does suggest a reservoir of feeling to oppose the lives around her that are wasted in mere action." Time magazine noted the standout performances of Donald Pleasence as the Head of British Intelligence and Vladek Sheybal as a minor agent.

References

External links

1972 films
British spy films
Cold War spy films
Films directed by Peter Collinson
Films shot at Pinewood Studios
Films shot in Spain
1970s action films
1970s adventure films
1970s English-language films
1970s British films